Saga Fredriksson (born 3 October 1994) is a Swedish footballer and sports broadcaster for Viaplay. She plays as a defender for Division 1 club Malmö FF.

Club career
She played for FC Rosengård from 2010 to 2013, winning two Damallsvenskan titles in 2010 and 2013 and a Super Cup in 2012.

International career
She was part of the Sweden U-19 that won the 2012 UEFA Women's U-19 Championship.

Honours

Club
LdB FC Malmö
Winner
 Damallsvenskan(3): 2010, 2011, 2013
 Svenska Supercupen(2): 2011, 2012
Runner-up
 Damallsvenskan: 2012

UCF Knights
Winner
 American Regular Season(2): 2014, 2017

Malmö FF
Winner
Division 2 Södra Götaland: 2022
Division 3 Skåne Sydvästra: 2021
Division 4 Skåne Sydvästra: 2020

International
Winner
 UEFA Women's U-19 Championship: 2012

Individual
AAC All-Rookie Team: 2014
AAC Co-Defensive Player of the Year: 2016
 All-Conference Second Team: 2016

References

External links
 
 
 soccerdonna.de at soccerdonna.de 

1994 births
Living people
Swedish women's footballers
FC Rosengård players
Damallsvenskan players
UCF Knights women's soccer players
Women's association football defenders
Footballers from Malmö